The 1st Women's Chess Olympiad, organized by the FIDE, took place between 2 and 21 September 1957, in Emmen, Netherlands.

Results

Preliminaries

A total of 21 two-woman teams entered the competition and were divided into three preliminary groups of seven teams. The top three from each group advanced to Final A, the teams placed 4th–5th to Final B, and 6th–7th to Final C. All groups and finals were played as round-robin tournaments.

Group 1 was won by the Soviet Union, well ahead of Netherlands and Romania.

East Germany took first place in group 2, ahead of Bulgaria and Hungary.

Group 3 was won by Yugoslavia, ahead of West Germany and England.

 Group 1: 

 Group 2:

 Group 3:

Final

{| class="wikitable"
|+ Final A
! # !!Country !! Players !! Points !! MP
|-
| style="background:gold;"|1 ||  || Olga Rubtsova, Kira Zvorykina  || 10½ || 12
|-
| style="background:silver;"|2 ||  || Maria Pogorevici, Margareta Teodorescu|| 10½ || 10
|-
| style="background:#cc9966;"|3 || || Edith Keller-Herrmann, Ursula Altrichter || 10 || 
|-
| 4 ||  || Irén Hönsch, Éva Kertész || 8½ || 
|-
| 5 ||  || Venka Asenova, Antonia Ivanova || 8 || 
|-
| 6 ||  || Lidija Timofejeva, Tereza Štadler || 7½ ||  
|-
| 7 ||  || Elaine Pritchard, Eileen Betsy Tranmer|| 7 || 
|-
| 8 ||  || Friedl Rinder, Ruth Landmesser || 6 || 
|-
| 9 ||  || Fenny Heemskerk, Catharina Roodzant, A. van der Veen|| 4 || 
|-
|}

{| class="wikitable"
|+ Final B
! # !! Country !! Players !! Points !! MP
|-
| 10 ||  || Gisela Kahn Gresser, Jacqueline Piatigorsky || 8 || 9
|-
| 11 ||  || Nina Hrušková-Bělská, Květa Eretová || 8 || 8
|-
| 12 ||   || Krystyna Hołuj, Mirosława Litmanowicz || 7½ || 
|-
| 13 ||  || Ingrid Larsen, Merete Haahr || 4½ || 
|-
| 14= ||  || Hilda Chater, Beth Cassidy || 1 || 1
|-
| 14= ||  || Peggy Steedman, R. P. Foggie || 1 || 1
|}

{| class="wikitable"
|+ Final C
! # !! Country !! Players !! Points
|-
| 16 ||  || Chantal Chaudé de Silans, Isabelle Choko || 8½
|-
| 17 ||  || Alfreda Hausner, Berta Zebinger || 7½
|-
| 18 ||  || Sirkka-Liisa Vuorenpää, Gunnel Jägerhorn || 6
|-
| 19 ||  || Tora Mølman, Carthy Skjønsberg || 4½
|-
| 20 ||  || Elisabeth Cuypers, Lilly Bollekens || 2½
|-
| 21 ||  || Tresch, Welter || 1
|}

Final «A»

Final «B»

Final «C»

Individual medals

 Board 1:  Krystyna Hołuj-Radzikowska 9 / 11 = 71.8%
 Board 2:  Kira Zvorykina 12 / 14 = 85.7%

References

External links
1st Women's Chess Olympiad: Emmen 1957 OlimpBase

Women's Chess Olympiads
Olympiad w1
Olympiad w1
Chess Olympiad w1
September 1957 sports events in Europe
Sports competitions in Emmen, Netherlands